Tumbarumba may refer to:
 Tumbarumba, a town in the Snowy Mountains region of New South Wales, Australia
 Tumbarumba Creek
 Tumbarumba wine region
 Tumbarumba Shire former local government area, merged into Snowy Valleys Council in 2016
 Tumbarumba railway line
 Tumbarumba Australian Football Netball Club